The 1991 Middle Tennessee Blue Raiders football team represented Middle Tennessee State University in the 1991 NCAA Division I-AA football season as a member of the Ohio Valley Conference.

Schedule

References

Middle Tennessee
Middle Tennessee Blue Raiders football seasons
Middle Tennessee Blue Raiders football